Arctomecon californica is a species of poppy known by several common names, including California bearpoppy, Las Vegas bearpoppy, golden bearpoppy, and yellow-flowered desert poppy. It is a perennial herb that is native to the eastern Mojave Desert.

Description

The plant flowers in mid spring with deep yellow petals from large buds on tall 1–3 feet branching inflorescences. Fruiting occurs in early summer.

Distribution and habitat
Arctomecon californica is native to the eastern Mojave Desert: in areas around Las Vegas, Nevada such as Tule Springs; the Lake Mead area; in and around Las Vegas; and in extreme Mohave County in Northwestern Arizona.  It is also known in Utah from a single collection in  Washington County, characterized as having "apparently occurred in cultivation on private property".

Conservation
The species has declined dramatically in recent decades and has now been petitioned for listing on the US Endangered Species list. It is a protected species in Nevada and Arizona due to its rarity. It is declining in its primary habitat in Nevada. Populations have undergone a serious decline associated with land development and grazing and the growth in the European and Africanized honeybee population associated with the latter. Habitat fragmentation is a possible contributing factor to reduced levels of genetic variation in populations in the Las Vegas Valley.

Ecology
Arctomecon californica is pollinated by a specialist bee, the Mojave poppy bee. Pollination occurs by female Mojave poppy bees who collect pollen from the plants to feed their young. The Mojave poppy bee is imperiled due to habitat loss.

References

External links

Nevada Natural Heritage Fact Sheet: Arctomecon californica
Arctomecon californica - Photo gallery

Papaveroideae
Flora of Nevada
Flora of Arizona
Flora of Utah
Natural history of the Mojave Desert
Plants described in 1845
Flora without expected TNC conservation status